Ambolomborona is a settlement in Madagascar. It is located in Andilamena, Toamasina.

Tradition culture roles
This is the place where Davidson R. resided and performed his public duty. He held the ody havandra ('hail medicine'), a talisman found in every rice-producing region of the Highlands. He used this staff to puncture the white clouds that brought out hail.

References

External links
Ambolomborona, Madagascar Weather Forecast and Conditions - weather.com
Ambolomborona Map | Madagascar Google Satellite Maps
Map of Ambolomborona, Madagascar

Populated places in Alaotra-Mangoro